Rock County is the name of three counties in the United States: 

 Rock County, Minnesota
 Rock County, Nebraska
 Rock County, Wisconsin